Winter Trees is a 1971 posthumous collection of poetry by Sylvia Plath, published by her husband Ted Hughes. Along with Crossing the Water it provides the remainder of the poems that Plath had written prior to her death in 1963.

Contents
 Winter Trees
 Child
 Brasilia
 Gigolo
 Childless Woman
 Purdah
 The Courage of Shutting-Up
 The Other
 Stopped Dead
 The Rabbit Cather
 Mystic
 By Candlelight
 Lyonnesse
 Thalidomide
 For A Fatherless Son
 Lesbos
 The Swarm
 Mary's Song
 Three Women

References

Further reading
 

1971 poetry books
Books by Sylvia Plath
Books published posthumously
Faber and Faber books
American poetry collections